Jason Carlton Thompson (born July 21, 1986) is a former American professional basketball player. He was a starting center playing college basketball for the Rider Broncs from 2004 to 2008, and was drafted in the first round of the 2008 NBA draft by the Sacramento Kings. He holds the record for most games played with the Kings during their tenure in Sacramento.

College career
A native of Mount Laurel, New Jersey, Thompson led Lenape High School to the 2004 New Jersey Group IV state title.

Thompson went on to play four seasons of college basketball for the Rider Broncs men's basketball from 2004 to 2008, where he was one of three players in the NCAA in 2006–07 to average 20 points and 10 rebounds per game. The other two were Kevin Durant of Texas and Nick Fazekas of Nevada.

As a senior during the 2007–08 season, Thompson averaged 20.4 points, 12.1 rebounds, 2.7 assists, 2.7 blocks and 1.1 steals per game. His strongest performance came on March 9, 2008 when he recorded 32 points and 18 rebounds against Marist College. He led Rider to the 2008 Metro Atlantic Athletic Conference Tournament finale against Siena College a day later. Rider fell short in a 74–53 loss in which Thompson registered 22 points and 12 rebounds. Rider finished the regular season and conference tournament schedule with a strong 23–10 record, but still missed an at-large bid to the NIT. However, Rider did receive a bid to the inaugural College Basketball Invitational tournament in 2008. Rider lost its first-round game to the Old Dominion Monarchs 68–65; Thompson finished with 15 points, 17 rebounds and 3 blocks. He concluded his collegiate career as the all-time leading rebounder in Broncs history.

Professional career

Sacramento Kings (2008–2015)
Thompson was selected with the 12th overall pick by the Sacramento Kings in the 2008 NBA draft. On July 8, 2008, he signed his rookie scale contract with the Kings. As a rookie in 2008–09, he played all 82 games for the Kings while averaging 11.1 points and 7.4 rebounds per game.

On October 25, 2009, the Kings exercised their third-year team option on Thompson's rookie scale contract, extending the contract through the 2010–11 season. He went on to have a career-best season as he averaged 12.5 points and 8.5 rebounds per game.

On October 25, 2010, the Kings exercised their fourth-year team option on Thompson's rookie scale contract, extending the contract through the 2011–12 season.

On June 25, 2012, the Kings tendered a qualifying offer to make Thompson a restricted free agent. On July 12, 2012, he re-signed with the Kings to a multi-year deal.

Golden State Warriors (2015–2016)
On July 10, 2015, Thompson was traded to the Philadelphia 76ers along with Carl Landry, Nik Stauskas, a future first round pick, and the rights to swap first round picks in 2016 and 2017, in exchange for the rights to Artūras Gudaitis and Luka Mitrović. On July 31, the 76ers traded Thompson to the Golden State Warriors in exchange for Gerald Wallace, cash and draft considerations. On February 22, 2016, he was waived by the Warriors. He appeared in just 28 games for the Warriors, and managed just 6.4 minutes per game.

Toronto Raptors (2016)
On March 1, 2016, Thompson signed with the Toronto Raptors. He appeared in 19 games for the Raptors to conclude the 2015–16 regular season, and was part of the Raptors' post-season run that saw them reach the Eastern Conference Finals for the first time in franchise history. In his first season playing in the post-season, Thompson played a minor role off the bench, managing just 5.5 minutes per game over 10 appearances.

Shandong Golden Stars (2016–2017)
In August 2016, Thompson signed with the Shandong Golden Stars for the 2016–17 CBA season.

In the summer of 2017, Thompson competed in The Basketball Tournament on ESPN for the Rebel Riders; a team composed of Rider University basketball alum.  In their first-round matchup, Thompson scored 14 points and grabbed a game-high 18 rebounds in the Rebel Riders' 78–70 loss to Team Fancy.

Fenerbahçe (2017–2018)
On July 29, 2017, Thompson signed with the Turkish club Fenerbahçe for the 2017–18 season. In 2017–18 EuroLeague, Fenerbahçe made it to the 2018 EuroLeague Final Four, its fourth consecutive Final Four appearance. Eventually, they lost to Real Madrid with 80–85 in the final game. Over 36 EuroLeague games, he averaged 5 points and 3.9 rebounds per game. On July 10, 2018, Fenerbahçe and Thompson parted ways.

Sichuan Blue Whales (2018–2019)
On August 11, 2018, Thompson signed a deal with Sichuan Blue Whales in the Chinese Basketball Association.

Casademont Zaragoza (2020–2021)
On February 1, 2020, Thompson signed with Casademont Zaragoza of the Liga ACB. He averaged 8.0 points and 6.3 rebounds per game between ACB and BCL. Thompson re-signed with the team on August 4.

Shanghai Sharks (2021)
On February 9, 2021, Thompson signed with Shanghai Sharks of the Chinese Basketball Association.

Guangdong Southern Tigers (2021) 
On April 4, 2021, Thompson signed with Guangdong Southern Tigers.

Wisconsin Herd (2022)
On January 7, 2022, Thompson was acquired via available player pool by the Wisconsin Herd.

Retirement
On October 3, 2022, Thompson announced his retirement from professional basketball.

Career statistics

NBA

Regular season

|-
| style="text-align:left;"| 
| style="text-align:left;"| Sacramento
| 82 || 56 || 28.1 || .497 || .000 || .692 || 7.4 || 1.1 || .6 || .7 || 11.1
|-
| style="text-align:left;"| 
| style="text-align:left;"| Sacramento
| 75 || 58 || 31.4 || .472 || .100 || .715 || 8.5 || 1.7 || .5 || 1.0 || 12.5
|-
| style="text-align:left;"| 
| style="text-align:left;"| Sacramento
| 75 || 39 || 23.3 || .507 || .000 || .605 || 6.1 || 1.2 || .4 || .6 || 8.8
|-
| style="text-align:left;"| 
| style="text-align:left;"| Sacramento
| 64 || 47 || 25.9 || .535 || .000 || .602 || 6.9 || 1.2 || .7 || .7 || 9.1
|-
| style="text-align:left;"| 
| style="text-align:left;"| Sacramento
| 82 || 81 || 27.9 || .502 || .000 || .694 || 6.7 || 1.0 || .6 || .7 || 10.9
|-
| style="text-align:left;"| 
| style="text-align:left;"| Sacramento
| 82 || 61 || 24.5 || .506 || .000 || .579 || 6.4 || .6 || .4 || .7 || 7.1
|-
| style="text-align:left;"| 
| style="text-align:left;"| Sacramento
| 81 || 63 || 24.6 || .470 || .000 || .622 || 6.5 || 1.0 || .4 || .7 || 6.1
|-
| style="text-align:left;"| 
| style="text-align:left;"| Golden State
| 28 || 1 || 6.4 || .476 || .000 || .625 || 1.9 || .7 || .1 || .3 || 2.1
|-
| style="text-align:left;"| 
| style="text-align:left;"| Toronto
| 19 || 6 || 15.4 || .485 || .333 || .818 || 4.2 || .5 || .4 || .6 || 4.6
|- class="sortbottom"
| style="text-align:center;" colspan="2" | Career
| 588 || 412 || 25.2 || .496 || .143 || .657 || 6.6 || 1.1 || .5 || .7 || 8.9

Playoffs

|-
| style="text-align:left;"| 2016
| style="text-align:left;"| Toronto
| 10 || 0 || 5.5 || .444 || .000 || .000 || 1.1 || .1 || .0 || .1 || .8
|- class="sortbottom"
| style="text-align:center;" colspan="2" | Career
| 10 || 0 || 5.5 || .444 || .000 || .000 || 1.1 || .1 || .0 || .1 || .8

EuroLeague

|-
| style="text-align:left;"| 2017–18
| style="text-align:left;"| Fenerbahçe
| 36 || 18 || 16.0 || .533 || .000 || .618 || 3.9 || .8 || .1 || .6 || 5.0 || 6.1
|- class="sortbottom"
| align="center" colspan="2"| Career
| 36 || 18 || 16.0 || .533 || .000 || .618 || 3.9 || .8 || .1 || .6 || 5.0 || 6.1

Personal life
Thompson's younger brother, Ryan, also played college basketball for Rider University and went on to play professionally in Europe.

See also
 List of NCAA Division I men's basketball players with 2000 points and 1000 rebounds

References

External links
 Jason Thompson at euroleague.net
 Jason Thompson at basketball-reference.com
 Rider Broncs bio

1986 births
Living people
21st-century African-American sportspeople
African-American basketball players
American expatriate basketball people in Canada
American expatriate basketball people in China
American expatriate basketball people in Spain
American expatriate basketball people in Turkey
American men's basketball players
Basket Zaragoza players
Basketball players from New Jersey
Centers (basketball)
Fenerbahçe men's basketball players
Golden State Warriors players
Lenape High School alumni
Liga ACB players
People from Mount Laurel, New Jersey
Power forwards (basketball)
Rider Broncs men's basketball players
Sacramento Kings draft picks
Sacramento Kings players
Shandong Hi-Speed Kirin players
Sichuan Blue Whales players
Sportspeople from Burlington County, New Jersey
Toronto Raptors players
20th-century African-American people